Armenian Semicoarsewool (also known as Armyanskaya Polugrubosherstnaya in Russian) is a breed of domesticated sheep found in Armenia.  A medium-wool fat-tail breed which is kept for meat and milk production. This breed was developed by crossing Rambouillet and Lincoln with Balbas.

Characteristics
This breed displays white and is unicolored.

References

Sheep breeds originating in Armenia